Boubacar Traoré (born 20 August 2001) is a Malian professional footballer who plays as a midfielder for  club Wolverhampton Wanderers and the Mali national team.

Club career 
Boubacar Traoré made his professional debut for FC Metz on the 10 May 2021, coming as a substitute of Kévin N'Doram in a Ligue 1 home game against Nîmes.

Traoré made a deadline day move to Wolverhampton Wanderers on 1 September 2022, on a season-long loan deal with an option to buy in the summer of 2023.

International career
Traoré is a youth international for Mali. he debuted with the senior Mali national team in a friendly 1–1 tie with Algeria on 16 November 2022.

Career statistics

International

References

External links

FC Metz profile

2001 births
Living people
Sportspeople from Bamako
Malian footballers
Mali international footballers
Mali youth international footballers
Association football midfielders
FC Metz players
Ligue 1 players
Championnat National 2 players
21st-century Malian people
Mali under-20 international footballers
Malian expatriate footballers
Malian expatriate sportspeople in France
Malian expatriate sportspeople in England
Expatriate footballers in France
Expatriate footballers in England